Deon Broomfield (born August 3, 1991) is a former American football safety and is currently a Safeties coach for Iowa State. He played college football at Iowa State.

High school
Broomfield attended Bayside High School in Palm Bay, Florida. As a sophomore, Broomfield helped the Bayside Bears to a 7-3 record and a trip to the playoffs. That year, he was named to the second-team all-district. As a junior, Broomfield recorded 85 tackles, three interceptions, and three fumble recoveries, making the Class 5A second-team all-state. In his senior season, Deon had nine interceptions, caused six fumbles (of which he recovered three), and led his team to the second round of the playoffs, finishing the season at 8-4. He again made the Class 5A second-team all-state, as well as making the first-team all-state coast.

In addition to football, Broomfield was a four-year letterman in track and field and was an honor roll student.

Considered a two-star recruit by Rivals.com, he was given a Rivals Rating of 5.2 He accepted a scholarship offer from Iowa State.

College career
Deon Broomfield redshirted his initial collegiate season in 2009. In 2010 Broomfield played mostly on special teams, playing in all 12 games and coming in second on the team with seven special teams tackles. In his sophomore season, 2011, Deon played in all 13 games and made 23 tackles, including five in an upset win over the No. 2 ranked Oklahoma State Cowboys. In that game Broomfield had a key third-down stop that set up an OSU missed field goal that sent the game into overtime. In 2012 Broomfield played in 13 games, starting six, made 45 tackles, and had two interceptions. In 2013, Broomfield's senior season, he started all 12 games at strong safety, ranked fourth on the team with 57 tackles, third on the team with six pass breakups, and second on the team with two fumble recoveries (both of which he caused). He also had an interception.

Broomfield ended his career at ISU with 133 tackles, 16 pass breakups, four forced fumbles, and three interceptions.

Professional career
Deon was signed as an undrafted free agent by the Buffalo Bills. On June 16, 2015, he was waived/injured by the Bills.

Coaching career
Broomfield coaches safeties in 2015 at Carthage College. In 2016, Broomfield became the cornerbacks coach for Western Illinois. Broomfield was named the cornerbacks coach at Indiana State. On  January 31, 2020 Broomfield was hired as a defensive assistant for the Houston Texans of the National Football League (NFL). In 2021 he served as the safeties coach for Iowa State.

References

Living people
1991 births
American football safeties
Iowa State Cyclones football players
Buffalo Bills players
People from Melbourne, Florida
Carthage Firebirds football coaches
Western Illinois Leathernecks football coaches
Indiana State Sycamores football coaches
Houston Texans coaches